Gaanderen is a railway station located in Gaanderen, Netherlands. The station was opened on 10 December 2006 and is located on the Winterswijk–Zevenaar railway. The train services are operated by Arriva.

Train services

Bus services
There is no bus service to and from this station as the station was built at the expense of the bus line through Gaanderen. At the time of creation, locals considered the station unnecessary since Terborg station is just outside Gaanderen. Today, however, buses still run through Gaanderen, namely Line 40 on the Doetinchem Station - Dinxperlo route. The nearest bus stop is Gaanderen, Winkelcentrum, which is 500m away.

References

External links

NS website 
Dutch Public Transport journey planner 
Arriva Gelderland website 
Arriva Achterhoek Network Map 

Railway stations in Doetinchem
Railway stations opened in 2006
2006 establishments in the Netherlands
Railway stations in the Netherlands opened in the 21st century